In enzymology, a glucose-1-phosphate thymidylyltransferase is an enzyme that catalyzes the chemical reaction

dTTP + alpha-D-glucose 1-phosphate  diphosphate + dTDP-glucose

Thus, the two substrates of this enzyme are dTTP and alpha-D-glucose 1-phosphate, whereas its two products are pyrophosphate and dTDP-glucose.

This enzyme belongs to the family of transferases, to be specific, those transferring phosphorus-containing nucleotide groups (nucleotidyltransferases).  This enzyme participates in 3 metabolic pathways: nucleotide sugars metabolism, streptomycin biosynthesis, and polyketide sugar unit biosynthesis.

Nomenclature 

The systematic name of this enzyme class is dTTP:alpha-D-glucose-1-phosphate thymidylyltransferase. Other names in common use include:
 glucose 1-phosphate thymidylyltransferase, 
 dTDP-glucose synthase, dTDP-glucose pyrophosphorylase, 
 thymidine diphosphoglucose pyrophosphorylase, 
 thymidine diphosphate glucose pyrophosphorylase, and 
 TDP-glucose pyrophosphorylase.

Structural studies

References

EC 2.7.7
Enzymes of known structure